Decoradrillia colorea is a species of sea snails, a marine gastropod mollusc in the family Drilliidae.

Description

Distribution
This species occurs in the shallow waters of the Western Atlantic off the Fernando de Noronha archipelago, Brazil.

References

 Fallon P.J. (2016). Taxonomic review of tropical western Atlantic shallow water Drilliidae (Mollusca: Gastropoda: Conoidea) including descriptions of 100 new species. Zootaxa. 4090(1): 1–363

External links

colorea
Gastropods described in 2016